Lamprothamnus is a genus of flowering plants belonging to the family Rubiaceae.

Its native range is Somalia to Tanzania.

Species:
 Lamprothamnus zanguebaricus Hiern

References

Rubiaceae
Rubiaceae genera